Maternity Protection Convention (Revised), 1952 is  an International Labour Organization Convention.

It was established in 1952, with the preamble stating:
Having decided upon the adoption of certain proposals with regard to maternity protection,...

Modification 
The convention revised Convention C3 on definition of women, to be also irrespective of race and creed, not only of age, marriage status and nationality, and was subsequently revised in 2000 by Convention C183 on minimum condition of maternity leave (from 12 weeks to 14 weeks) and women's rights.

Ratifications
As of 2013, the convention had been ratified by 41 states. Subsequently, the treaty has been denounced by 17 of the ratifying states, some automatically due to ratification of conventions that trigger automatic denunciation of the 1952 treaty.

External links 
Text.
Ratifications.

Maternity
Motherhood
Women's rights instruments
Treaties concluded in 1952
Treaties entered into force in 1955
Treaties of the Bahamas
Treaties of Bolivia
Treaties of the military dictatorship in Brazil
Treaties of Chile
Treaties of Croatia
Treaties of Ecuador
Treaties of Equatorial Guinea
Treaties of Ghana
Treaties of Greece
Treaties of Guatemala
Treaties of Kyrgyzstan
Treaties of the Libyan Arab Republic
Treaties of the Mongolian People's Republic
Treaties of Papua New Guinea
Treaties of the Polish People's Republic
Treaties of the Soviet Union
Treaties of San Marino
Treaties of Francoist Spain
Treaties of Sri Lanka
Treaties of Tajikistan
Treaties of the Ukrainian Soviet Socialist Republic
Treaties of Uruguay
Treaties of Uzbekistan
Treaties of Zambia
Treaties of Yugoslavia
1952 in labor relations
1952 in women's history